Rogovik is a rural locality (a village) in Dobryansky District, Perm Krai, Russia. The population was 6 as of 2010.

Geography 
Rogovik is located 19 km northwest of Dobryanka (the district's administrative centre) by road. Lipovo is the nearest rural locality.

References 

Rural localities in Dobryansky District